Wilkes–Barre Area School District is an urban public school district located in Luzerne County, Pennsylvania, United States. The District encompasses approximately 123 square miles. The district includes the city of Wilkes-Barre as well as smaller surrounding municipalities. It serves: Bear Creek Township, Borough of Bear Creek Village, Borough of Laflin, Buck Township, City of Wilkes-Barre, Laurel Run Borough, Plains Township and Wilkes-Barre Township. According to 2000 federal census data, the district serves a resident population of 62,749. In 2009, the residents' per capita income was $16,751, while the
median family income was $40,336.

As of 2020–2021, total student enrollment in the district was 7.089, according to National Center for Education Statistics data.

The district operates five elementary schools, one middle school, one junior high school and one high school, Wilkes-Barre Area High School.

Schools
Dr. David Kistler Elementary School
Boyd Dodson Elementary School
Daniel J. Flood Elementary School
Heights-Murray Elementary School
Solomon Elementary School
GAR Middle School
Solomon Plains Junior High School
Wilkes-Barre Area STEM Academy
Wilkes-Barre Area High School

In 2021, Elmer L. Meyers Junior/Senior High School, G. A. R. Memorial Junior/Senior High School, and James M. Coughlin High School were consolidated into Wilkes-Barre Area High School.

Extracurriculars 

The school district offers a wide variety of activities, clubs and sports.

References

External links 
 Wilkes-Barre Area School District Homepage

School districts in Luzerne County, Pennsylvania